The 1995 African U-17 Championship, was the first U-17 football competition organized by the Confederation of African Football (CAF). The tournament took place in Mali. It also served as CAF's  qualifier for the 1995 FIFA U-17 World Championship.

Qualification

Qualified teams

 (host nation)

Group stage

Group A
{| cellpadding="0" cellspacing="0" width="100%"
|-
|width="60%"|

Group B
{| cellpadding="0" cellspacing="0" width="100%"
|-
|width="60%"|

Knock-out stage

Semi-finals

For winning their semi-finals, Ghana and Nigeria qualified for the 1995 FIFA U-17 World Championship with Guinea and Mali meeting in the third place match for the third and final place in the 1995 FIFA U-17 World Championship.

Third place match

For winning the third place match, Guinea qualified for 1995 FIFA U-17 World Championship with Mali missing out.

Final

Winners

References

External links
RSSSF.com
Confederation of African Football

Africa U-17 Cup of Nations
Under-17 Championship
African Under-17 Championship
International association football competitions hosted by Mali
1995 in youth association football